Puberty Blues (novel), is a 1979 novel by the Australian writers Gabrielle Carey and Kathy Lette.

Puberty Blues may also refer to:
 Puberty Blues, a 1981 film based on the novel.
 "Puberty Blues" (song), a song written by Tim Finn and recorded by Jenny Morris for the 1981 Australian film.
 Puberty Blues (TV series), an Australian drama television series